Jabez K. Walker was a member of the Wisconsin State Assembly during the 1876 and 1877 sessions. A Republican, he represented Waushara County, Wisconsin. He was born on August 5, 1819, in Poland, Maine. At the time, the town was located in Cumberland County, Maine.

References

People from Poland, Maine
People from Waushara County, Wisconsin
Republican Party members of the Wisconsin State Assembly
1819 births
Year of death missing